The Foundation for Endangered Languages is a non-profit organization, registered as Charity 1070616 in England and Wales, founded in 1996. Its current chairman is Nicholas Ostler.

It exists to support, enable, and assist the documentation, protection, and promotion of endangered languages.

The Foundation awards small grants (of the order of US$1,000) for all kinds of projects that fall within this remit. It also publishes a newsletter, OGMIOS: Newsletter of Foundation for Endangered Languages, and hosts an annual conference, with proceedings that are available as published volumes.

External links 
 Foundation for Endangered Languages web site
 OGMIOS: Newsletter of Foundation for Endangered Languages
 Contents of the proceedings volumes

Educational charities based in the United Kingdom
Endangered languages projects
Linguistics organizations
Organizations established in 1996